The Sierra San Antonio is a mountain range in southernmost Arizona state (U.S.) and northern Sonora state (México).

Geography
The range is named after the Roman Catholic Saint Antonio.

The Sierra La Esmeralda, northernmost range of the Sierra Madre Occidental cordillera, begins south of the Sierra San Antonio. Two miles (3.2 km) north of the border and the Sierra San Antonio is Mount Washington at 7,221 ft (2,201 m), the highest peak of the Patagonia Mountains.

Regional sky island ecology
Various species are studied in the Madrean Sky Islands habitats in higher elevation mountains of northern Sonora and Chihuahua, southeast Arizona, and southwestern New Mexico. One example is research on horned lizards in mountainous areas in northern Mexico in various mountain ranges, including the Sierra San Luis range to the east.

See also
 List of Madrean Sky Island mountain ranges - Sonoran - Chihuahuan Deserts
 Sierra La Esmeralda
 Sierra San Luis

References

External links
  Brycetowsley.com: View of Sierra San Antonio (photo)

Madrean Sky Islands mountain ranges
Mountain ranges of Sonora
Mountains of Arizona
Mountain ranges of Santa Cruz County, Arizona